San Mao Joins the Army is a 1992 Chinese comedy film directed and co-written by Zhang Jianya and starring Wei Zongwan and Jia Lin. It is base on the Manhua of the same name by Zhang Leping. It was produced and distributed by Shanghai Film Studio. The film premiered in China in 1992. The film follows the story of San Mao and his comrade-in-arms Laogui in the Battle of Shanghai.

Plot
In 1937, after the Marco Polo Bridge Incident, the Second Sino-Japanese War breaks out. San Mao (Jia Lin), a wandering orphan, joins the army, where he meets his comrade-in-arms Laogui (Wei Zongwan), they participate in the Battle of Shanghai lead by Feng Yuxiang, Chen Cheng and Zhang Zhizhong in Shanghai. One day, they are dropped into the jungle, but the plane never comes to pick them up again. They live in the jungle for a long time and become savages. One day, a plane flies over the jungle and scatters numerous leaflets. After reading the leaflet, they know that the war is over.

Cast
 Jia Lin as San Mao
 Wei Zongwan as Laogui
 Sun Feihu as Chiang Kai-shek
 Zhu Yi as Division commander Niu
 Zhang Mingyu as Regimental commander
 Li Ying as Wife
 Jiang Wen as Girl
 Dong Lin as Drillmaster
 Shi Ling as General
 Zhan Che as Policeman
 Su Zhenyu as Young Master
 Xu Caigen as Japanese soldier
 Hu Ronghua as Military official

Reception
Douban gave the drama 8.3 out of 10.

Accolades

References

External links
 
 

1992 films
1990s Mandarin-language films
1990s war comedy films
Chinese war comedy films
Children's war films
Films set in Shanghai
1990s children's comedy films
1992 comedy films